Caldwell Academy is a private, Independent Classical Christian school located in Greensboro, North Carolina. Caldwell provides a TK–12 education from a Classical Christian perspective.

History
Caldwell Academy is named after David Caldwell. He was an early era minister in Guilford County as well as an educator and physician. He was born in Pennsylvania in 1725 and came to the area in order to pastor Buffalo and Alamance Presbyterian Churches.  Along with his pastoral duties David Caldwell founded a Log-College.  This served as the first schoolhouse in Guilford County.

In 1994, an organization of families in Greensboro, North Carolina sought to establish a school for their children that would teach from a Christian stance.  The name "Caldwell Academy" was derived from the life of David Caldwell, a Greensboro native who operated in the late-18th and early-19th century.  In 1995 the school opened in the fall with a few hundred students ranging from kindergarten to 6th grade.  The school was originally operating out of rented space at a local church until its move to a permanent location in the summer of 1999. The permanent location started off with "Founders Hall" and "Smith Building" along with some modulars. Over the summer of 2007 a new grammar building, "Munchkin Hall" was built and K–5 was moved to the new building. Later that year they finished the construction of a new athletic facility equipped with a soccer field, multi-purpose/practice field, and a baseball diamond.

A Classical Education 
Classical Education is at the forefront of Caldwell Academy's desires for its students.  This philosophy of education is based on the concept of the Trivium, which recognizes that there are three stages of learning that coincide with the cognitive development of a child.  Caldwell Academy has four divisions: the Preschool, the Grammar School (grades K–5), the Dialectic School (grades 6-8), and the Rhetoric School (grades 9–12).  The divisions form a cohesive whole which allows and encourages students to pursue their education in increasingly mature and complex ways as they grow and develop.

Grammar
In a classical school, the instructional goal for grammar school students is mastery of the fundamental facts and rules of each subject. The students are to accumulate a broad core knowledge. The methodology involves memorization, repetition, and chants combined with the study of Latin introduced in 3rd grade.

Dialectic 
Dialectic School (grades 6–8) is where students continue to add to the core knowledge from their Grammar years, and begin work on mastering the skills (studying, organization, test-taking, public speaking) needed to be successful during the Rhetoric (high school) years.

Rhetoric 

Rhetoric school (grades 9–12) students learn how to express what they know and what they are learning through the use of debate, apologetics, public speaking, essay writing, and drama. 
Graduates of Caldwell Academy have gone on to attend such institutions as Appalachian State University, Clemson University, Wake Forest University, The University of North Carolina at Wilmington, The University of North Carolina at Chapel Hill, The University of North Carolina at Greensboro, Belmont University, The University of Texas at Austin, Hillsdale College, Meredith College, North Carolina State University, Wheaton University, Davidson College, and Virginia Tech, studying in fields ranging from Business, Social Work and Law to Philosophy to the Physical Sciences, Christian Leadership and Biblical languages.

Athletics  
The Caldwell Academy Eagles compete in the North Carolina Independent Schools Athletic Association, Triad Athletic Conference, and Triad Middle School Athletic Conference.
Caldwell Academy prides itself in its prestigious athletic achievements through the years.  Complete with  Volleyball, Tennis, Cross Country, Track, Soccer, Golf, Baseball, Softball, Basketball, Swimming, and Cheer Teams. Athletics and academics go hand in hand when it comes to the dedication of its students.

References

External links
 Official website

Schools in North Carolina